The Royal Air Force is the United Kingdom's air force.

Royal Air Force may also refer to:

Air forces
 Royal Air Force of Oman
 Royal Australian Air Force
 Royal Bahraini Air Force
 Royal Brunei Air Force
 Royal Cambodian Air Force
 Royal Canadian Air Force
 Royal Danish Air Force
 Royal Malaysian Air Force
 Royal Moroccan Air Force
 Royal Netherlands Air Force
 Royal New Zealand Air Force
 Royal Norwegian Air Force
 Royal Saudi Air Force
 Royal Thai Air Force
 Regia Aeronautica ("Royal Air Force"), Italy's air force from 1923 to 1946
 Royal Hellenic Air Force, an air force from 1935 to 1973

Other uses
 Real Fuerza Aérea, a Mexican wrestling group